Andrés Alberto Hernández Socas (born 8 March 1977 in Las Palmas, Canary Islands), known as Alberto, is a Spanish former professional footballer who played as a defensive midfielder.

External links

1977 births
Living people
Spanish footballers
Footballers from Las Palmas
Association football midfielders
La Liga players
Segunda División players
Segunda División B players
Tercera División players
UD Las Palmas Atlético players
UD Las Palmas players
Universidad de Las Palmas CF footballers
UD Almería players
AD Ceuta footballers